The 2022 Lewisham London Borough Council election took place on 5 May 2022. All 54 members of Lewisham London Borough Council were up for election. The elections took place alongside local elections in the other London boroughs and elections to local authorities across the United Kingdom.

The Labour Party maintained its control of the council, winning all 54 seats, mirroring its landslide victory in the 2018 election. The 2022 election took place under revised election boundaries, with the number of councillors remaining the same. 

The election coincided with an election for the Mayor of Lewisham, which was won by the incumbent Damien Egan of the Labour Party.

Background

History

The thirty-two London boroughs were established in 1965 by the London Government Act 1963. They are the principal authorities in Greater London and have responsibilities including education, housing, planning, highways, social services, libraries, recreation, waste, environmental health and revenue collection. Some of the powers are shared with the Greater London Authority, which also manages passenger transport, police and fire.

Since its formation, Lewisham has generally had a Labour majority. The only exceptions have been the period between 1968 and 1971 when the Conservatives controlled the council and a period of no overall control from 2006 to 2010 (though under the mayoral system Labour still formed the administration). Labour regained control of the council in the 2010 election, winning 39 seats to the Liberal Democrats' twelve seats. The Conservatives won two seats and the Green Party won one seat. Labour extended its majority in the 2014 election, winning 53 seats with a single Green councillor being election. In the most recent council election in 2018, Labour won all fifty-four seats to the council with 60.2% of the vote across the borough. The Conservatives received 13.9% of the vote, the Liberal Democrats received 12.0% of the vote and the Green Party received 11.6% of the vote, but none won any seats. The Labour candidate Damien Egan became mayor of Lewisham in the concurrent mayoral election.

Council term

In 2019, a Labour councillor for Evelyn, Alex Feis Bryce, resigned due to work commitments. At the same time, a Labour councillor for Whitefoot, Janet Daby, resigned after winning the 2018 Lewisham East by-election. Labour held both seats, with Lionel Openshaw winning in Evelyn and Kim Powell winning in Whitefoot. Alan Smith, a Labour councillor for Catford South, left his party to sit as an independent in June 2019 in protest against the leadership of Jeremy Corbyn.

Tom Copley, a councillor for Sydenham, resigned after being appointed as a deputy mayor by Sadiq Khan in early 2020. Skip Amrani, a Labour councillor for Catford South, resigned in March 2020 due to family commitments. Joe Dromey, a councillor for New Cross, resigned in January 2020 due to taking on a politically restricted job. Sue Hordijenko, a Labour councillor for Bellingham ward, died in February 2021. Due to the COVID-19 pandemic, all four by-elections were held on 6 May 2021 alongside the 2021 London mayoral election and London Assembly election. Labour held all four seats. Bellingham was won by Rachel Onikosi. Catford South was won by James Royston, who worked for an animal welfare charity. New Cross was won by Samantha Latouche and Sydenham was won by Jack Lavery.

As with most London boroughs, Lewisham elected its councillors under new boundaries decided by the Local Government Boundary Commission for England, which it produced after a period of consultation. The number of councillors has remained at 54, under new boundaries with sixteen three-councillor wards and two two-councillor wards.

Electoral process
Lewisham, like other London borough councils, elects all of its councillors at once every four years. The previous election took place in 2018. The 2022 election took place by multi-member first-past-the-post voting, with each ward being represented by three councillors. Electors had as many votes as there are councillors to be elected in their ward, with the top two or three being elected.

All registered electors (British, Irish, Commonwealth and European Union citizens) living in London aged 18 or over were entitled to vote in the election. People who live at two addresses in different councils, such as university students with different term-time and holiday addresses, were entitled to be registered for and vote in elections in both local authorities. Voting in-person at polling stations took place from 7:00 to 22:00 on election day, and voters were be able to apply for postal votes or proxy votes in advance of the election.

Previous council composition

Campaign

The incumbent mayor Damien Egan was re-selected by the Labour Party, with 81% of members voting for him to remain as their candidate in 2022.

Results summary

Ward Results

References

Council elections in the London Borough of Lewisham
Lewisham